Xavier High School in Cedar Rapids, Iowa is the only Catholic high school in the local metropolitan area. It is affiliated with twelve area Catholic parishes and the Archdiocese of Dubuque. Xavier opened in 1998 after the merger of two previous Catholic high schools, Regis and LaSalle.

School information
Xavier High School is a member of the National Catholic Education Association and is accredited by the State of Iowa.  58% of the faculty has a M.A. or PhD in their area.

Its campus encompasses a full  in northeastern Cedar Rapids. The  facility is capable of managing up to 811 students under the current layout. Xavier enjoys several advantages in facilities over other Metro area high schools. The football, baseball, softball, and soccer fields are all located on-campus, as well as two full football and soccer practice fields. Newly remodeled tennis courts are on-campus as well. A disk golf course is in place throughout the grounds for students' use at their leisure. There is a pond on the eastern edge of campus that students may use for recreation and fishing as well as professional water polo. Xavier provides an iPad for each student.

Student information
The students at Xavier High School primarily come from the surrounding area's Catholic middle schools: Regis Middle School and LaSalle Middle School (the former high schools that merged to form Xavier) in Cedar Rapids, and Saint Joseph's School in Marion, Iowa.

Athletics
The Saints compete in the Mississippi Valley Conference in the following sports:
Cross Country
 Boys' 2-time Class 3A State Champions (2006, 2007)
 Girls'  2-time State Champions (2003, 2007)
Volleyball
Football
 4-time State Champions (2006, 2017, 2018, 2022)
Basketball
 Boys' 2-time Class 3A State Champions (2016, 2017)
 Girls' 5-time State Champions (2003, 2005, 2007, 2013, 2021)
Wrestling
Track and Field
 Boys' 2-time Class 3A State Champions (2007, 2008)
Golf
Soccer
 Boys' 7-time State Champions (2004, 2005, 2006, 2010, 2011, 2013, 2015)
 Girls' 9-time State Champions (2004, 2006, 2007, 2008, 2009, 2010, 2011, 2012, 2013)
Softball
Baseball
 2006 Class 3A State Champions 
Tennis
Bowling

On June 19, 2007, Sports Illustrated named Xavier as the top athletic high school for the 2006–2007 school year in the state. In 2010, Xavier's girls soccer team was recognized as 4th in the Nation. The Saints girls soccer program has won eight consecutive state titles, and holds the record in Iowa for most consecutive titles won, male or female. The Xavier Athletics Program was recognized by the Des Moines Register as the best in the state of Iowa for medium-sized schools in 2006-07 and again in 2014–15. The Saints football team have won state championships in 2006, 2017, 2018, and 2022, going undefeated in the 2018 and 2022 seasons.

Fine arts
The school offers numerous choral, instrumental, visual arts and theatrical programs for students.

Activities and clubs
There are over 1000 co-curricular activities at Xavier. Some of these include intramural basketball, Key Club, National Honor Society, Breakfast Club, SADD, Model UN, BPA (Business Professionals of America), FIRST Tech Challenge, and many others.  Many of these clubs include competitive aspects.

Xavier Xcentrics
Xavier's FIRST Tech Challenge team, the Xavier Xcentrics, advanced to World Competitions in Detroit in the 2018 season.

Notable alumni
 Ryan Sweeney - Chicago Cubs outfielder (Class of 2003) 
 Joey Gase - NASCAR stock car driver (Class of 2011)
Mitch Keller - Pittsburgh Pirates pitcher (Class of 2014)
Matt Nelson - Detroit Lions

See also
List of high schools in Iowa

References

External links
Xavier High School Website
Xavier Foundation

Catholic secondary schools in Iowa
Private high schools in Iowa
Educational institutions established in 1998
Schools in Cedar Rapids, Iowa
1998 establishments in Iowa
Schools in Linn County, Iowa